The cryptic triplefin, Cryptichthys jojettae, is a triplefin of the family Tripterygiidae, the only member of the genus Cryptichthys, found around the coast of New Zealand.  It length is up to 6 cm. The specific name honours a former staff member at the National Museum of New Zealand, Jorjette Drost, who participated in collecting specimens with Hardy.

References

Tripterygiidae
Endemic marine fish of New Zealand
Fish described in 1987